Rönninge SK is a sports club in Rönninge, Sweden. The women's soccer team played six seasons in the Swedish top division between 1982 and 1987.

Also scoring table tennis successes, the club won the Swedish women's national team championship in 2002.

References

Table tennis clubs in Sweden
Defunct football clubs in Sweden